B K Birla Centre For Education is a Boys'  residential school located near Pune. Affiliated to the Central Board of Secondary Education syllabus, it caters for 600 students from class IV to XII. The school's first principal was G. C. Rao, who was further succeeded by  S. K. Bhardwaj and then Subhash Kumar. The school also had a temporary principal, Matthew Menezis, before Bhardwaj.

Saibal Kumar Sanyal is the current principal of the school. The School has been given the IPSC and NPSC status.

References

External links
B K Birla Center For Education (Official Website)

Boys' schools in India
Schools in Pune district
Schools in Pune
Private schools in Maharashtra
Boarding schools in Maharashtra

High schools and secondary schools in Maharashtra
1998 establishments in Maharashtra